The Globalized City: Economic Restructing and Social Polarization in European Cities is a collection of discussions and case studies of large-scale urban development projects in nine European cities. It analyzes the relation between these projects and trends such as social exclusion, the emergence of new urban elites, and the consolidation of less democratic forms of urban governance.

Summary
The book offers in-depth analyses of linkages between urban restructuring and social exclusion against the backdrop of trends in urban governance across the European Union, examining neo-liberal and New Urban policies that increasingly favour private investment and deregulation of labour markets. The aim is to clarify the relationship between new urban spaces and the emergence of new forms of polity, economy, and urban life which may not necessarily promote social harmony within the metropolitan areas.

Case studies
The nine case studies in the book identify a number of large-scale urban development projects and look into the respective variation of governance systems at different scales. They also indicate how these local projects reflect global trends, institutional forms and strategic practices. The nine megaprojects include:

 The Europeanization of Brussels
 The Guggenheim museum in Bilbao
 The financial district in Dublin
 The science-university-technology complex 'Adlershof' in Berlin
 The 1998 World Expo in Lisbon
 The Olympic Games bid by Athens
 The Donau City in Vienna
 The Oresund project in Copenhagen
 The new business district in Naples

These case studies are thoughtful examinations of the argument that mega-projects and events are vital for urban development.

See also 
ESDP Network
ESPRID
Regional development
Social exclusion
Social innovation
Urban decay

2005 non-fiction books
Social rejection
Urban decay
Sociology books